The Reflex S is a French paramotor that was designed by Dominique Cholou and produced by Reflex Paramoteur of Chatou for powered paragliding. Now out of production, when it was available the aircraft was supplied complete and ready-to-fly.

Design and development
The "S" was designed to comply with the European microlight regulations.

As is the case with all paramotors, take-off and landing is accomplished by foot. Inflight steering is accomplished via handles that actuate the canopy brakes, creating roll and yaw.

Specifications (S)

References

S
2000s French ultralight aircraft
Single-engined pusher aircraft
Paramotors